Jill Vidal often referred to as Wei Si or simply as Jill, is a Hong Kong-based female urban pop singer and actress. Vidal is of Korean and Filipino ethnicity with British nationality.
Her twin sister, Janice Vidal, is also a singer in Hong Kong.

Career and personal life

Music
In 2005, Jill Vidal entered the music industry by signing with Amusic, a record label of East Asia Record Production. She released her first song, Lonely, in December 2005.
Vidal released her debut album Hit Me, in 2006.

In 2015, she joined Warner Music Hong Kong along with her twin sister, Janice Vidal. Her first single "Fulfilled Love" (被滿足的愛) (feat. San E) after joining Warner Music was recorded in Korea and was released on 16 May 2016.  Subsequently, the English version, I Can See (feat. San E) was released on 24 June 2016. On 17 October of the same year, her second single, "Need for Love" (感情需要) was released and reached a high of no.2 spot on Metro Radio FM 99.7 charts. On 12 December 2016, her third single, "Lonely Christmas" a cover originally sang by Eason Chan was released just in time for the holiday season.

On 10 April 2017, her fourth single "Tattoo" (刺青) in pop rock style was released and climbed to the no.1 spot on Metro Radio FM 99.7 charts. On 27 November of the same year, "Suffocate" (缺氧) was released. The song was written for Jill based on conveying the feeling when you love someone so much that you feel suffocated. The MV for "Suffocate" was an open call contest and the winning MV was directed by Frankie Lo and Gavin Ngan.

Arrest
Vidal and her singer boyfriend Kelvin Kwan were arrested in Tokyo on 24 February 2009 over allegations of marijuana possession.  Police were summoned when the pair were caught shoplifting in the district of Shibuya and marijuana was subsequently found in a cigarette in their possession.  Kwan confessed to the police that it had been given to him by a friend in Hong Kong, while Vidal said that she was not aware it was marijuana. Urine tests later returned positive results for marijuana for Kelvin Kwan; police allegedly found another banned substance in the pair's luggage. Kwan was released without charge after 32 days in jail. Later, local journals reported that Vidal was being held due to heroin being more extreme that marijuana – the unnamed banned substance previously reported to have been found in her luggage was heroin of her own simple possession weighing of 1.36 grams.

On 24 April, Vidal pleaded guilty in Tokyo court to heroin possession, and was sentenced to two years' imprisonment, suspended for three years. She was deported back to Hong Kong and did not serve any prison time.

Acting
Vidal made her film debut in 2006 in the musical film, A Melody Looking directed by Leon Lai.

Theatre
In August 2014, Vidal starred as the leading female role in, TELEMA! Awaken the Dream, an African drama to celebrate the 51st anniversary of Martin Luther King Jr’s “I have a dream” speech.

Advertising
In 2006, Jill and her twin sister, Janice Vidal starred in a McDonald's commercial involving dialogues of Chinese tongue twisters. The shooting of the commercial took a long time as the Vidal sisters are not native Chinese speakers.

Reborn book release
Vidal has since converted to Christianity since the incident in Japan in 2009. On 23 July 2011, Vidal released her autobiography, Reborn at the Hong Kong Book Fair describing how God heard her prayers and transformed her from darkness to light.

Vidal jewellery
In November 2016, Vidal launched her own jewellery label, 'Vidal', in collaboration with charity organisation and international jewellery label Eden Ministry, which employs former sex workers.

Discography

Filmography

Awards

References

1982 births
Living people
English-language singers from Hong Kong
Hong Kong people of Filipino descent
Hong Kong people of Korean descent
Hong Kong Christians
21st-century Hong Kong women singers
Hong Kong film actresses
Hong Kong television actresses
Hong Kong twins
Warner Music Hong Kong artists